Tourilli may refer to:

 Tourilli Lake, body of water of Lac-Croche, Quebec, Canada
 Tourilli River, watercourse of Saint-Gabriel-de-Valcartier, Quebec, Canada